Yongning Subdistrict is a subdistrict in Zengcheng District, Guangzhou, Guangdong, China. , it has 8 residential communities and 22 villages under its administration.

See also 
 List of township-level divisions of Guangdong

References 

Township-level divisions of Guangdong
Zengcheng District
Subdistricts of the People's Republic of China